Julien Canal (born 15 July 1982 in Le Mans) is a French racing driver who currently competes in the European Le Mans Series with Panis Racing.

Career

Single-seaters
After competing in karting, where he finished third in the French Championship Elite in 2000, Canal stepped up to single-seaters in 2003. He raced in French Formula Renault for four seasons, scoring his first podium in his final season in 2006 and finishing sixth overall. He also raced in the Eurocup Formula Renault 2.0 series in each of those four seasons.

GT racing
Canal switched to GT racing in 2007 when he started racing in the Porsche Carrera Cup France. He finished ninth, tenth and eighth in the three seasons he contested, scoring one podium finish and two pole positions. In 2010 he took part in the FFSA GT Championship.

He joined the Larbre Compétition team to race their Saleen S7-R in the opening round of the 2007 Le Mans Series season at Circuit Paul Ricard, where they were the only team entered in the GT1 class. He returned to the team for the 2007 24 Hours of Le Mans, where they won the GT1 class in 13th overall.

In 2011 Larbre entered the new GTE-Am class in a Chevrolet Corvette C6.R, with Canal again winning the class at Le Mans with the team. They repeated the feat in 2012.

Personal
Canal operated a McDonald's restaurant in his hometown Le Mans. As per 2022, Canal has opened 3 McDonald's restaurants in cities outside Le Mans

Racing record

Racing career summary 

† As Canal was a guest driver, he was ineligible to score points.

Complete European Le Mans Series results 
(key) (Races in bold indicate pole position; results in italics indicate fastest lap)

Complete FIA World Endurance Championship results

† There was no LMGTE Am drivers championship that year, the result indicates standings in overall standings.

Complete 24 Hours of Le Mans results

Complete WeatherTech SportsCar Championship results
(key) (Races in bold indicate pole position) (Races in italics indicate fastest lap)

* Season still in progress.

References

External links

1982 births
Living people
Sportspeople from Le Mans
French racing drivers
FIA GT Championship drivers
European Le Mans Series drivers
American Le Mans Series drivers
24 Hours of Le Mans drivers
French Formula Renault 2.0 drivers
Formula Renault Eurocup drivers
German Formula Renault 2.0 drivers
FIA World Endurance Championship drivers
Rebellion Racing drivers
Larbre Compétition drivers
Greaves Motorsport drivers
G-Drive Racing drivers
OAK Racing drivers
Manor Motorsport drivers
Tech 1 Racing drivers
Graff Racing drivers
WeatherTech SportsCar Championship drivers
AF Corse drivers
Signature Team drivers